HMS Mindful was a  which served with the Royal Navy during the First World War. The M class destroyers were an improvement on the previous , capable of higher speed. The vessel, launched in 1915, joined the Twelfth Destroyer Flotilla under the flotilla leader . The ship saw action during the Battle of Jutland in May 1916 and helped sink the German torpedo boat . In March 1917, the destroyer was involved in a friendly fire incident, nearly sinking the British submarine . In June that year, the vessel was involved in the sinking of the German merchant ship SS Gamma in Norwegian waters, which led to a diplomatic protest from the Norwegian government. At the end of the war, Mindful was withdrawn from service and, in 1921, sold to be broken up.

Design and development
Mindful was one of nine  destroyers ordered by the British Admiralty in November 1914 as part of the Second War Construction Programme. The M-class was an improved version of the earlier  destroyers, required to reach a higher speed in order to counter rumoured German fast destroyers. It transpired that the German ships did not exist.

The vessel achieved  in trials. Three funnels were fitted.

Armament consisted of three single QF  Mk IV guns on the ship's centreline, with one on the forecastle, one aft on a raised platform and one between the middle and aft funnels. Torpedo armament consisted of two twin mounts for  torpedoes. A single QF 2-pounder  "pom-pom" anti-aircraft gun was mounted between the torpedo tubes. The ship had a complement of 80 officers and ratings.

Construction and career
Mindful was launched by Fairfield Shipbuilding and Engineering Company at their shipyard in Govan on the River Clyde on 24 August 1915 and completed on 10 November the same year. This was the first time the name had been used by the Royal Navy. The vessel was deployed as part of the Grand Fleet, joining the Twelfth Destroyer Flotilla under the flotilla leader .

On 30 May 1916, the destroyer sailed with the Grand Fleet to confront the German High Seas Fleet in what would be the Battle of Jutland. The destroyer was deployed in action against the German light cruisers. At 6:29 PM on 1 June, the destroyer was hit by a  shell, but it did not explode. Shortly afterwards, the division saw the approaching line of the German Third Torpedo Boat Flotilla and attacked. The destroyer, along with the rest of the flotilla, sank the torpedo boat , previously disabled by the destroyer . As the battle closed, the Flotilla spotted the retreating German line. The First Division was ordered to attack and use their superior speed to speed ahead of the German ships. However, Mindful had only two boilers working and so did not follow Faulknor. Instead, the destroyer headed south and acted independently. The destroyer twice tried to attack the German fleet, both times having to turn away to avoid colliding with other Royal Navy destroyers.

After the battle, the destroyer served in anti-submarine patrols. On 20 August, while patrolling east of the Orkney Islands, the destroyer fired at the German submarine , successfully driving the submarine down, thus rescuing the trawler Pacific that had been under attack from the submarine. On 15 March 1917, the destroyer was involved in a friendly fire incident. It turned out that the ships were attacking the British submarine , which was damaged but was not sunk.

On 2 June 1917, Mindful was involved in the sinking of the German steamship, SS Gamma. The destroyer was patrolling off the Norwegian coast along with the light cruiser  and sister ship Marvel when the merchantman was spotted. A warning shot was fired and Gamma turned to the Norwegian shore. The British vessels pursued and Marvel fired a torpedo that sank the ship. The Norwegian government protested the violation of their neutrality and presented the UK government with a bill of 3,406,124 marks, given to them by the German government, which the British government ignored. The cruise also led to protests from five other vessels, sailing under Norwegian and Swedish flags, four of which the Royal Navy admitted were stopped in neutral waters.

After the Armistice, the Royal Navy returned to a peacetime level of strength. Initially, Mindful was transferred to the Defence Flotilla at Devonport. However, the harsh conditions of wartime service, exacerbated by the fact that the hull was not galvanised and operations often required high speed in high seas, meant that the destroyer was worn out and ready for retirement. On 22 September 1921, the vessel was sold to G. Cohen and broken up in Germany.

Pennant numbers

References

Citations

Bibliography

 
 
  
 
 
 
 
 
 
 
 
 
 
 
 
 

1915 ships
Admiralty M-class destroyers
Ships built on the River Clyde
World War I destroyers of the United Kingdom